The 2018 World Para Athletics European Championships was a track and field competition for athletes with a disability open to International Paralympic Committee (IPC) affiliated countries within Europe, plus Azerbaijan and Israel. It was held in Berlin, Germany and took place between 20 and 26 August 2018 at the Friedrich-Ludwig-Jahn-Sportpark. 596 athletes from 35 countries competed during the championships.

Formerly the IPC Athletics European Championships, this was the first edition of the championships since IPC undertook a rebrand of all sports for which they are the governing body, including the 'World Para' title for the committees running each sport. IPC Athletics was rebranded World Para Athletics in 2016; its first World Para Athletics Championships were held in 2017, and the European Championships followed suit in 2018.

Russia were unable to compete due to their ongoing suspension from IPC and World Para Athletics. Poland topped the medal table.

Venue

The venue for the Championships was the Friedrich-Ludwig-Jahn-Sportpark athletics stadium in the Northeast of Berlin.

Format
The 2018 World Para Athletics European Championships was an invitational championships for track and field events. No combined sports were included and not all events were open to all classifications, no events were contested between classifications.

Athletes who came in first place were awarded the gold medal, second place the silver medal and third place the bronze. If only three competitors were declared to compete in an event then no bronze medal was awarded. Some events were classed as 'no medal' events.

Events

Classification

To ensure competition is as fair and balanced as possible, athletes are classified dependent on how their disability impacts on their chosen event/s. Thus athletes may compete in an event against competitors with a different disability to themselves. Where there are more than one classification in one event, (for example discus throw F54/55/56), a points system is used to determine the winner. RaceRunning, an event using adapted tricycle frames for athletes with a severe balance impairment, was introduced for the first time in the RR category, while 'blade' athletes, using a prosthetic specialist limb were placed in new *61-4 categories, while athletes with lower limb disabilities, but not amputations, remained in the *42-4 categories.

F = field athletes
T = track athletes
11-13 – visually impaired, 11 and 12 compete with a sighted guide
20 – intellectual disability
31-38 – cerebral palsy or other conditions that affect muscle co-ordination and control. Athletes in class 31-34 compete in a seated position; athletes in class 35-38 compete standing.
40-47 – arm amputation, lower limb deficiencies and les autres
51-58 – wheelchair athletes
61-63 – leg amputees, 'blade' athletes
RR1-3 – racerunners who employ an adapted tricycle to maintain balance.

Summary 

36 athletes won two gold medals or more at the event, while the seven listed below won 3 golds or more. Pierre Fairbank of France, with 4 gold medals, was the most successful athlete at the event, with Diana Dadzite of Latvia and Sophie Hahn of Great Britain the most successful female athletes with 3 gold medals.

The most successful home athletes were Felix Streng and Johannes Floors, with three gold and one silver medal each.

Alexandra Helbling of Switzerland won 5 medals, a gold, 3 silvers and a bronze, the most medals of any athlete at the event.

Broken records
15 World Records were broken in total across all events, with a further 9 European records also falling. Lucyna Kornobys of Poland was the only athlete to break two world records, setting new marks in the women's javelin F33 and shot put F33. Markus Rehm of Germany broke his own world record in the long jump T64 with a distance of 8.48 - a distance that would have won the able bodied event a few weeks earlier.

Medal table 

In a number of events not all medals were awarded, due to field sizes or tied medals. In addition, a small number of rces were deemed 'non-medal' events, and are therefore not included in the final medal table.

Final table, 26 August 2018.

Participating nations
Below is the list of countries who participated in the Championships.  were unable to take part due to their ongoing suspension from the IPC.

Footnotes
Notes

References

See also

 2018 World Para Swimming European Championships, held in the National Aquatic Centre, Dublin.
 2018 European Athletics Championships, also held in Berlin.

External links
 Official web-site

 
World Para Athletics European Championships
World Para Athletics European Championships
World Para Athletics European Championships
International athletics competitions hosted by Germany
Sports competitions in Berlin
World Para Athletics European Championships
2018 in disability sport